"Help Me!!" is the 52nd single by the J-pop group Morning Musume, released in Japan on January 23, 2013.

Release details
"Help Me!!" will be the first single by Morning Musume on which Sakura Oda participates.

The single will be released in eight versions: regular editions A and B and six limited editions: A, B, C, D, E, and F. The Limited Editions A, B, and C will come with a bonus DVD, all the other edition will be CD-only. Also, all the limited editions will include an entry card for the lottery to win a launch event ticket.

Members at time of single 
6th generation: Sayumi Michishige, Reina Tanaka
9th generation: Mizuki Fukumura, Erina Ikuta, Riho Sayashi, Kanon Suzuki
10th generation: Haruna Iikubo, Ayumi Ishida, Masaki Sato, Haruka Kudo
11th generation : Sakura Oda

Help Me!! Vocalists

Main Voc: Reina Tanaka, Riho Sayashi

Center Voc: Mizuki Fukumura, Sakura Oda

Minor Voc: Sayumi Michishige, Erina Ikuta, Kanon Suzuki, Haruna Iikubo, Ayumi Ishida, Masaki Sato Haruka Kudo

Track listing

Regular Edition A

Limited Editions A, B, C, Regular Edition B

Limited Edition D

Limited Edition E

Limited Edition F

Charts

Bonus
Sealed into all the Limited Editions
 Event ticket lottery card with a serial number.

References

External links
 Profile on the Hello! Project official website 
 Profile on the Up-Front Works official website 
 Tsunku's comment on the single

2013 singles
Japanese-language songs
Morning Musume songs
Songs written by Tsunku
Song recordings produced by Tsunku
Zetima Records singles
Oricon Weekly number-one singles
2013 songs
Japanese synth-pop songs